Augustus Hall (April 29, 1814 – February 1, 1861), a lawyer, was a one-term Democratic U.S. Representative from Iowa's 1st congressional district, and chief justice of the Nebraska Territory.

Biography
Born in Batavia, New York, Hall was the son of Samuel Hall, who commanded a colonial company in the War of 1812 and was a member of the Whig Party. He attended the common schools and Middleburgh (New York) Academy, and studied law. He was admitted to the bar in 1836 and commenced practice in Mount Pleasant, Ohio (according to some sources) or Mount Vernon, Ohio (according to his congressional biography). Hall served as assistant United States marshal in 1839, and prosecuting attorney of Union County from 1840 to 1842. In 1844 he moved to Keosauqua, a settlement in the southeast area of what was then Iowa Territory, and later the state of Iowa when Iowa was admitted to the Union in 1846. In 1852 he was chosen by the Democrats as one of the presidential electors and cast his vote for Franklin Pierce, who had carried Iowa.

In 1854, Hall was elected as a Democrat to represent Iowa's 1st congressional district in the U.S. House, defeating Whig candidate R. L. B. Clark. He served in the Thirty-fourth Congress, from March 4, 1855, to March 3, 1857. The 1854 election was the last before the establishment of the Iowa Republican Party, which for decades thereafter dominated most congressional elections in Iowa. In 1856 Hall won the Democratic nomination, but was defeated in the general election by Republican Samuel Curtis.

In 1858, President Buchanan appointed Hall as chief justice of the Nebraska Territory, which then encompassed a vast area west of the Missouri River (to the western edge of the Louisiana Purchase) and north of Kansas Territory (to the Canada–US border). Upon his appointment he immediately moved to Bellevue, Nebraska. He was Chief Justice until his death in Bellevue on February 1, 1861. He was interred in Prospect Hill Cemetery in North Omaha.

Hall and his wife, Jane B. Smith Hall, were the parents of Richard Smith Hall, who became a leading Omaha attorney. Hall was also the father of the horticulturalist Theodosia Burr Shepherd.

Hall County, Nebraska, where Grand Island is located, was reportedly named for Chief Justice Hall, although some attribute the name to a local citizen.

See also
 Founding figures of Omaha, Nebraska

References

1814 births
1861 deaths
People from Batavia, New York
Politicians from Omaha, Nebraska
Burials at Prospect Hill Cemetery (North Omaha, Nebraska)
County district attorneys in Ohio
United States Marshals
Nebraska Democrats
Democratic Party members of the United States House of Representatives from Iowa
People from Keosauqua, Iowa
19th-century American politicians
People from Bellevue, Nebraska